Katrin Kallsberg (born 30 July 1967 in Denmark) is a Faroese gynaecologist and politician Republic (Tjóðveldi).

Early life and education 
Katrin Kallsberg was born, 30 July 1967, in Denmark. Her parents, Olga and Kaj Kallsberg, are Faroese. She lived in Denmark the first six years of her life, until the family moved back to the Faroe Islands. The rest of her childhood she lived in Eiði (1975-1979) and Tórshavn where her father Kaj Kallsberg was working as a physician. At the age of 16 she spent one year in the U.S. as an exchange student. After that she went to the high school of Tórshavn in Hoydalar. She studied medicine in Denmark and specialized to become a gynaecologist.

Career

Medical career
In 1995, she worked as a physician in Srebrenica with Doctors Without Borders for a short period.
After Screbrenica, she moved back to the Faroe Islands to work as a gynaecologist and consultant surgeon at the hospital in Tórshavn, Landssjúkrahúsið.

Kallsberg was chairwomen of the Faroese Equal Status Council (Javnstøðunevndin) from March 2012 until February 2016. She  participated in the Faroese TV-documentary Fólksins Rødd and participates in the Faroese radio debate programme Also.

Political career 
She was elected to the Løgting representing Republic (Tjóðveldi) at the 2015 general election with 396 personal votes.

2015-2019 Chairwoman of the Welfare Committee
2015-2019 Member of the Culture Committee

Personal life 
Kallsberg's husband, Poul Henrik Poulsen, died from cancer, in 2005. They have two children, Brandur and Sólja.

References 

1967 births
Faroese women in politics
Living people
Members of the Løgting
Republic (Faroe Islands) politicians
People from Tórshavn
Faroese gynaecologists
Women gynaecologists
Faroese women physicians
21st-century Danish women politicians